Husseinat are the members of an ethnic group of Sudan. They live around the 
White Nile. They are Muslims and speak Sudanese Arabic. The number of persons in this group is about 100,000.

References
Joshua Project

Ethnic groups in Sudan